Francesca Pavan (born 1979) was an Italian female water polo player. Francesca was a member of the Italy women's national water polo team, playing as driver, and she was a part of the  team at the 2008 Summer Olympics.

At the club level, Francesca played for Plebiscito Padova in Italy.

References

External links
 
Women's World League (Lille, FRA): Italy defeats France in shoot-out / Spain takes second triumph | fina.org - Official FINA website

1979 births
Living people
Sportspeople from Venice
Italian female water polo players
Water polo players at the 2008 Summer Olympics
Olympic water polo players of Italy
21st-century Italian women